The Psychological Record is a quarterly peer-reviewed scientific journal covering behavior analysis. It was established in 1937 by Jacob Robert Kantor, with B.F. Skinner serving as founding editor of the journal's experimental department. It is published by the Association for Behavior Analysis International in partnership with Springer Science+Business Media; before that, it was published by Southern Illinois University, Carbondale. The editor-in-chief is Mitchell Fryling (California State University, Los Angeles). According to the Journal Citation Reports, the journal has a 2017 impact factor of 1.026.

References

External links

Behaviorism journals
Springer Science+Business Media academic journals
Quarterly journals
Publications established in 1937
Academic journals published by international learned and professional societies
English-language journals